Liang Chen and Wang Yafan were the defending champions when the event was previously held in 2015, however, Liang chose not to participate. Wang successfully defended her title alongside Duan Yingying, defeating Dalila Jakupović and Irina Khromacheva 6–3, 6–3 in the final.

Seeds

Draw

References
Main Draw

Women's Doubles 
Hua Hin Championships - Doubles
 in women's tennis